Versailles is a French historical fiction drama Canal+ original television series, set during the construction of the Palace of Versailles during the reign of Louis XIV, that premiered on 16 November 2015 on Canal+ in France and on Super Channel in Canada in May 2016 on BBC Two in Britain, and on 1 October 2016 on Ovation in the United States. 

A second season was ordered prior to the season one premiere. Filming for the second season began in February 2016; its story took place four years after that of the first season. The second season premiered on 27 March 2017 in France and aired from 21 April 2017 in Britain. On 14 September 2016, producer Claude Chelli confirmed that Versailles had been renewed for a third season, which began filming in April 2017. On 17 April 2018, Variety reported that the third season of Versailles would be its last.

Plot introduction
In the wake of the Fronde in 1667, the French nobility had begun to defy and disobey the monarchy. Young King Louis XIV (George Blagden) decides to move the court from the Château de Saint-Germain-en-Laye near Paris to his father's former hunting lodge near the hamlet of Versailles as a means to force their submission. As Louis renovates and expands his new Palace of Versailles, the nobles—displaced from their usual surroundings, but compelled to accompany the king—become embroiled in increasingly dangerous intrigues.

Cast

Main
George Blagden as Louis XIV, King of France
Alexander Vlahos as Monsieur Philippe I, Duke of Orléans, brother of the king
Tygh Runyan as Fabien Marchal, the king's chief of police
Stuart Bowman as Alexandre Bontemps, valet of the king
Amira Casar as Béatrice, Madame de Clermont 
Evan Williams as Chevalier de Lorraine, lover of the Duke of Orléans
Noémie Schmidt as Henrietta of England, first wife of Phillipe 
Anna Brewster as Françoise-Athénaïs, Marquise de Montespan, the king's favourite mistress
Sarah Winter as Louise de La Vallière 
Suzanne Clément as Madame Agathe 
Catherine Walker as Madame Scarron / Madame de Maintenon 
Elisa Lasowski as Marie-Thérèse, Queen Consort of France
Maddison Jaizani as Béatrice's daughter Sophie de Clermont, later the Duchesse de Cassel
Jessica Clark as Elizabeth Charlotte, Princess of the Palatinate, Philippe's second wife 
Pip Torrens as the Duke de Cassel 
Harry Hadden-Paton as Gaston de Foix 
Greta Scacchi as Madeleine de Foix

Recurring
Lizzie Brocheré as Claudine Masson, midwife who becomes the king's physician
Steve Cumyn as Jean-Baptiste Colbert, Minister of Finance
Gilly Gilchrist as Jacques
Dominique Blanc as Anne of Austria
Joe Sheridan as François-Michel le Tellier, Marquis de Louvois
Geoffrey Bateman as Jacques-Bénigne Bossuet
Ken Bones as Cardinal Leto
Thierry Harcourt as André Le Nôtre
Anatole Taubman as Montcourt
Alexis Michalik as Louis, Duke of Rohan
George Webster as William of Orange
Mark Rendall as Thomas Beaumont
Ned Dennehy as Father Étienne
James Joint as Father Pascal
Matthew McNulty as Guillaume, a cobbler who serves in the army under Philippe
Jenny Platt as Jeanne, Guillaume's sister

Production
Versailles was created by British writers Simon Mirren and David Wolstencroft, both of whom were previously based in Hollywood. It is the most expensive French television series of all time, with a budget of €30 million (approximately $33 million) for its first season.

A second season was ordered prior to the season one premiere. Filming for the second season began in February 2016; its story took place four years after that of the first season.

On 14 September 2016, producer Claude Chelli confirmed that Versailles had been renewed for a third season, which would begin filming in April 2017. On 11 May 2017, the official Instagram account of Château de Vaux-le-Vicomte published pictures of the ongoing shoot of the third season. On 17 April 2018, Variety reported that the third season of Versailles would be its last.

Filming locations

In addition to the Palace of Versailles, many other palaces and chateaux were filmed for the depiction of the unfinished Versailles, including:
The Château de Champs-sur-Marne gardens
The Château de Janvry
The Château of Lésigny
The Château de Maisons-Laffitte (pictured below)
The Château de Pierrefonds (pictured below) used as the castle preuses room
The Château de Sceaux
The Château of Vigny
The commune of Rambouillet
Vaux-le-Vicomte (pictured below)

Episodes

Series overview

Season 1 (2015)

Season 2 (2017)

Season 3 (2018)
The third season was released on demand in its entirety on 23 April 2018.

Broadcast
Versailles premiered on 16 November 2015 on Canal+ in France and on Super Channel in Canada, in May 2016 on BBC Two in Britain, and on 1 October 2016 on Ovation in the U.S. The Movie Network gave early access to all of season 2 in October 2016, prior to its 2017 broadcast dates. The series stayed on the English-language Super Channel until May 2016 but was gone by December 2016, after TMN had made season 2 available early. The French version of Super Channel is keeping the show available until 8 November 2020. City aired the first six episodes of season 1 from 4 January to 25 February.

The second season premiered on 27 March 2017 in France, and on 21 April 2017 in Britain. At some point after the first season concluded, Super Channel lost the Canadian broadcast rights to the series. Subsequently, The Movie Network picked up those rights and began airing reruns of the first season.

In April 2016, Netflix acquired the rights to stream Versailles. Netflix released the third and final season of Versailles on 2 April 2019.

Reception
The first season of Versailles received mixed to positive reviews from critics. It holds a 55 out of 100 rating on Metacritic, based on six reviews, and an 80% rating on Rotten Tomatoes, with an average score of 6.56 out of 10, based on 10 reviews. Marjolaine Boutet of Le Monde gave the first season a mixed review, stating that its ambition was both its main flaw and what made it a quality television series, and added that the series' most fascinating character, Louis XIV's gardener Jacques (Gilly Gilchrist), did not have enough screen time.

The third season has an approval rating of 44% on Rotten Tomatoes based on nine reviews, with an average rating of 5.2 out of 10.

References

External links
 (archived)

TV Review: Versailles – Variety
Welcome to Versailles – The Daily Telegraph
 Versailles Wiki, Fandom

2015 French television series debuts
2018 French television series endings
Canal+ original programming
Citytv original programming
Cultural depictions of Jean-Baptiste Colbert
Cultural depictions of William III of England
2010s French drama television series
French LGBT-related television shows
Crave original programming
Palace of Versailles
Super Channel (Canadian TV channel) original programming
Television series set in the 17th century
Television shows set in France
Works about Louis XIV
Biographical films about French royalty